The Yehliu Ocean World is an oceanarium in Yehliu Village, Wanli District, New Taipei, Taiwan.

History
The oceanarium was opened in 1980. On 13 July 2013, the building was hit by surge of waves caused by Typhoon Soulik causing NT$5 million in damage.

Architecture
The theme park has a seating capacity of 3,500 seats. It also includes a 100 meters long underwater tunnel.

Attractions
The oceanarium features an aquarium which consists of various sea creatures.

Transportation
The theme park is accessible by bus from Keelung Station of the Taiwan Railways.

See also
 List of tourist attractions in Taiwan

References

External links

  

1980 establishments in Taiwan
Amusement parks opened in 1980
Aquaria in Taiwan
Tourist attractions in New Taipei